Vrbas may refer to:

 Vrbas (river), river in Bosnia and Herzegovina
 Vrbas, Donji Vakuf, village in Donji Vakuf, Bosnia and Herzegovina
 Vrbas, Serbia, town and municipality in Vojvodina, Serbia

See also
Vrba (disambiguation)